The 2015 season was Terengganu's 5th season in the Malaysia Super League, and their 20th consecutive season in the top-flight of Malaysian football. In addition, they were competing in the domestic tournaments, the Malaysia FA Cup and the Malaysia Cup

Terengganu will announce their sponsors for the 2015 season as well as presenting the new kits on 18 January 2015.

Club

Current coaching staff

Management 

 Last updated:

Kit sponsors
• Umbro •

Players

Squad information

Transfers and loans

All start dates are pending confirmation.

In

November

April

Out

November

April

Loan out

Pre-season and friendlies

Competitions

Overview
Updated as of 18 September 2015.

Super League

League table

Results summary

Results by round

Matches 

 
Kickoff times are in +08:00 GMT.

FA Cup

Round of 32

Round of 16

Quarter-finals

Semi-finals

Malaysia Cup

Group stage

Source: FAM
Last updated:

Statistics

Squad statistics

|-
! colspan="14" style="background:#dcdcdc; text-align:center"| Goalkeepers

|-
! colspan="14" style="background:#dcdcdc; text-align:center"| Defenders

|-
! colspan="14" style="background:#dcdcdc; text-align:center"| Midfielders

|-
! colspan="14" style="background:#dcdcdc; text-align:center"| Forwards

|-
! colspan="14" style="background:#dcdcdc; text-align:center"| Transfers out

Perak vs Terengganu no record

Top scorers

Last updated:4 November 2015  
Source: Match reports in Competitive matches

Clean sheets

Last updated:12 September 2015  
Source: Match reports in Competitive matches

Disciplinary record

See also
 2015 Malaysia Super League season

References

External links
 Terengganu FA Website

Terengganu FC seasons
Malaysian football clubs 2015 season
Malaysian football club seasons by club